Janhagel or Jan Hagel is a typical Dutch kind of cookie. It is a rectangular, brittle cookie, covered with granulated sugar (the 'hagel') and possibly almond shavings. It's an old Dutch specialty.

Many people know Jan Hagel as small cookies with anise sugar on it, but there is also another form of Jan Hagel, a taai-taai-like cake with anise taste. This cake is still baked by Bakery Kok.

Previously, this cake was known as 'Strontboen' Jan Hagel. Because when farmers had cleaned the stable the staff ate Jan Hagel. The unique taste makes Jan Hagel similar to Nougat.

See also 
 List of cookies

References

Dutch cuisine
Cookies